Garani may refer to:
 Garani, Hormozgan, Iran
 Garani, Kičevo, North Macedonia
 Granai, Afghanistan; also romanized Garani